"Love Train" is a hit single by the O'Jays, written by Kenny Gamble and Leon Huff.  Released in 1972, it reached No. 1 on both the R&B Singles and the Billboard Hot 100 in February and March 1973 respectively, and No. 9 on the UK Singles Chart and was certified gold by the RIAA.  It was the O'Jays' first and only number one record on the US pop chart. The song has been considered one of the first songs of disco music.

"Love Train" entered the Hot 100's top 40 on January 27, 1973, the same day that the Paris Peace Accords were signed. The song's lyrics of unity mention a number of countries, including England, Russia, China, Egypt and Israel, as well as the continent of Africa.

Recorded at Philadelphia's Sigma Sound Studios, the house band MFSB provided the backing. Besides its release as a single, "Love Train" was the last song on the O'Jays' album Back Stabbers. "Love Train" was a 2006 inductee into the Grammy Hall of Fame.

Music video
The music video shows a group of people forming a human chain near a railroad station, while at the same time, some railroad cars are shown in motion. Throughout the video, more people join in the chain, which they call the "Love Train".  It was most likely filmed around the Northeast Corridor, as Long Island Rail Road MP75 railcars appear throughout the music video (in which the words "LONG ISLAND" are clearly visible), as well as Amtrak railcars, Penn Central railcars, and other railcars. It was recorded in 1973.

Charts

Weekly charts

Year-end charts

Certifications

Cover versions
By early 1974, The Supremes' line up (Wilson, Birdsong and Payne) adopted the song to perform in live appearances. Hall & Oates covered it for the 1989 soundtrack to the film Earth Girls Are Easy, as well as Daryl Hall and his band joining the 2016 version of the O'Jays in a live version on Hall's Live from Daryl's House television show. The Rolling Stones played Love Train on their worldwide Licks Tour during 2002 and 2003. Roots rock 'n' roll band The Yayhoos' take on the song appeared on their 2006 release, "Put The Hammer Down." Gospel Group Doc McKenzie and the Hi-Lites did a rendition in 2003. In 2006 Mötley Crüe drummer Tommy Lee performed "Love Train" for the ending credits of Final Destination 3.

"Love Train" was sampled in the 1973 break-in record, "Super Fly Meets Shaft" (US #31).

An Australasian cover was recorded in 1973 by Dalvanius Prime.
Australian singer Kylie Minogue performed a version during her 1991 Let's Get to It Tour.

The Wiggles' album Racing to the Rainbow features a cover of Love Train on the deluxe edition of the CD.

Anna Kendrick, Justin Timberlake, James Corden and Ron Funches performed the song in the opening of Trolls Holiday. Australian band Human Nature included it on their 2018 album Romance of the Jukebox.

See also 
 List of anti-war songs
 List of Billboard Hot 100 number-one singles of 1973

References

External links
 [ Song review] on AllMusic
 

1972 songs
1972 singles
1973 singles
The O'Jays songs
Songs written by Leon Huff
Songs written by Kenny Gamble
Philadelphia International Records singles
Billboard Hot 100 number-one singles
Cashbox number-one singles
Disco songs
Songs about India